is an American-born Japanese professional tennis player who specializes in doubles.

She won her first Grand Slam title at the 2022 French Open alongside Wesley Koolhof in mixed doubles, and also reached the women's doubles semifinals at the 2021 Wimbledon Championships and 2022 Australian Open with Shuko Aoyama. Shibahara reached her career-high doubles ranking of world No. 4 in March 2022, and has won eight titles on the WTA Tour, including the 2021 Miami Open, also reaching the semifinals at the 2021 WTA Finals.

She made her Billie Jean King Cup debut for Japan in 2020, and also participated in the 2020 Olympic Games in Tokyo. Until July 2019, Shibahara represented her country of birth, the United States.

College career
In 2016, she graduated from Palos Verdes Peninsula High School and attended UCLA before turning pro after her sophomore season.

Professional career

2016: First major main draw
Shibahara made her Grand Slam main-draw debut at the US Open in the girls' doubles draw, partnering with Jada Hart as a wildcard. Shibahara and Hart then won the US Open girls' doubles title. The pair also entered with wildcards the women’s doubles event in which they lost in the first round.

2019: Focus on doubles, start of partnership with Shuko Aoyama
Shibahara played her first five doubles tournaments of the year with Hayley Carter winning two titles and reaching another final.  This raised her doubles ranking from 205 at the beginning of the year to an entry into the top 100 with a ranking of 98 on May 20th.

Shibahara then played tournaments with eight other partners before playing her first tournament with Shuko Aoyama in August at the Silicon Valley Classic in San Jose, where they reached the final.  Shibahara said, "Our chemistry was spot on from the beginning, where I would set her up from the baseline and she just moves all over the net".

Shibahara and Aoyama played five more tournaments together in 2019, winning their first two titles together at the Tianjin Open (Shibahara's first WTA tour level title) and  Kremlin Cup in Moscow.  By the end of the year Shibahara's WTA doubles ranking was 31.

In singles Shibahara started the year playing a mixture of ITF and WTA challenger tournaments.  Following a quarter final result at the $100k Vancouver tournament her ranking reach her career high (so far) of 416 on August 19th.  Following this Shibahara focused mainly on doubles.

2020–2021: WTA 1000 title, Olympics, Grand Slam & WTA Finals SF
Partnering Shuko Aoyama she won her maiden WTA 1000 title at the 2021 Miami Open, reached the semifinals at Wimbledon, participated in the Tennis at the 2020 Summer Olympics in Japan and reached the semifinals of the 2021 WTA Finals. She won seven more titles, five being at the WTA 500 level, during her successful partnership with Aoyama.

2022: World No. 4 in doubles, maiden mixed-doubles title
At the Australian Open, she reached the semifinals of a major for the second time in her career, partnering Aoyama. Later, she set a new career-high ranking of No. 4, on 21 March 2022, after making the Indian Wells Open final where she partnered with Asia Muhammad.

At the French Open, she won the first Grand Slam title of her career in mixed doubles, partnering with Wesley Koolhof. She became the first Japanese player in 25 years to win the mixed doubles championship in Paris, since Rika Hiraki and Mahesh Bhupathi took home the title in 1997.

2023: Australian Open finalist
At the Australian Open, she reached the semifinals of a major for the third time in her career, partnering again with Aoyama. The pair defeated second-seeded pair of Coco Gauff and Jessica Pegula to reach their first major final.

Performance timeline

Only main-draw results in WTA Tour, Grand Slam tournaments, Fed Cup/Billie Jean King Cup and Olympic Games are included in win–loss records and career statistics.

Doubles
Current after the 2023 Dubai Tennis Championship.

Mixed doubles

Significant finals

Grand Slam tournaments

Women's doubles: 1 (runner-up)

Mixed doubles: 1 (title)

WTA 1000 tournaments

Doubles: 2 (1 title, 1 runner-up)

WTA career finals

Doubles: 12 (8 titles, 4 runner-ups)

WTA Challenger finals

Doubles: 2 (1 title, 1 runner–up)

ITF Circuit finals

Doubles: 9 (7 titles, 2 runner–ups)

Junior Grand Slam tournament finals

Girls' doubles: 1 (title)

Notes

References

External links
 
 

1998 births
Living people
American female tennis players
Japanese female tennis players
American sportspeople of Japanese descent
Japanese-American tennis players
US Open (tennis) junior champions
Grand Slam (tennis) champions in girls' doubles
French Open champions
Grand Slam (tennis) champions in mixed doubles
Olympic tennis players of Japan
Tennis players at the 2020 Summer Olympics
21st-century American women
UCLA Bruins women's tennis players